Turn the Lights Out is the third album from American indie/garage rock band, The Ponys. It was released on 20 March 2007. It was the first album from the band to be released on Matador Records, having been previously signed to In the Red Records.

Track listing
All songs written by Jered Gummere, Melissa Elias, Nathan Jerde, and Brian Case.
"Double Vision" - 3:37
"Everyday Weapon" - 2:16
"Small Talk" - 4:13
"Turn the Lights Out" - 2:36
"1209 Seminary" - 3:06
"Shine" - 4:21
"Kingdom of Hearts" - 2:04
"Poser Psychotic" - 3:45
"Exile on My Street" - 2:21
"Harakiri" - 3:28
"Maybe I'll Try" - 2:56
"Pickpocket Song" - 6:52

Notes
The iTunes version includes the bonus track "Something in the Air".
The song "Double Vision" was featured in EA Sports game NHL 08, played in Entourage, season four, episode "Dream Team" and featured in GMC's 2010 Terrain commercial.

References

2007 albums
The Ponys (band) albums
Matador Records albums
Albums produced by John Agnello